Robert E. Jones may refer to:

 Robert E. Jones Jr. (1912–1997), US House of Representative from Alabama
 Robert E. Jones (judge) (born 1927), Oregon Supreme Court and federal district judge
 Robert Earl Jones (1910–2006), American actor and father of James Earl Jones
 Robert Edmond Jones (1887–1954), American theater designer of sets, lighting, costumes
 Robert Elijah Jones (1872–1960), United States clergyman, Bishop of the Methodist Episcopalian Church

See also
Robbie Jones (disambiguation)